The Usolka is a river in Perm Krai, Russia, left tributary of the Kama.

References 

Rivers of Perm Krai